Ipomoea leptophylla, the bush morning glory, bush moonflower or manroot, is a flowering plant species in the bindweed family, Convolvulaceae.

It belongs to the morning glory genus Ipomoea and is native to the Great Plains of western North America. It has a large Tuber.

The Latin specific epithet leptophylla means "fine- or slender-leaved."

References

leptophylla
Flora of North America